Jaroslav Vojta (27 December 1888 – 20 April 1970) was a Czechoslovak film actor. He appeared in more than 90 films between 1921 and 1970.

Selected filmography

 Karel Havlíček Borovský (1925)
 The Lantern (1925)
 Hraběnka z Podskalí (1926)
 Hordubalové (1937)
 Muž z neznáma (1939)
 The Girl from Beskydy Mountains (1944)
 The Adventurous Bachelor (1946)
 Komedianti (1954)
 Dog's Heads (1955)
 Against All (1956)
 I Dutifully Report (1958)
 První parta (1959)

References

External links
 

1888 births
1970 deaths
Czech male film actors
Czech male silent film actors
20th-century Czech male actors
People from Kutná Hora